The All-CHA Teams are composed of players at all positions from teams that were members of College Hockey America men's conference, a former NCAA Division I hockey-only conference. Each year, from 1999–00 thru 2009–10, at the conclusion of the CHA regular season the head coaches of each member team vote for players to be placed on each all-conference team. All three teams (First, Second and Rookie) were named in every CHA season. The all-CHA teams were discontinued after the 2009–10 season when the CHA was disbanded when they could no longer retain their automatic bid to the NCAA Tournament.

The all-conference teams were composed of one goaltender, two defensemen and three forwards. If a tie occurred for the final selection at any position, both players were included as part of the all-conference team; if a tie resulted in an increase in the number of First Team all-stars, the Second Team would be reduced in numbers accordingly (as happened in 2007–08). Players may only appear once per year on any of the first or second teams but freshman may appear on both the rookie team and one of the other all-conference teams.

All-conference teams

First Team

First Team players by school

Multiple appearances

Second Team

Second Team players by school

Multiple appearances

Rookie Team

First Team players by school

See also
CHA Awards

References

External links
CHA First All-Star Team (Incomplete)
CHA Second All-Star Team (Incomplete)
CHA All-Rookie Team (Incomplete)

College ice hockey trophies and awards in the United States